Sasa Palamarevic  (born 16 July 1986) is a Canadian water polo player. He was a member of the Canada national team, playing as a centre forward. He was a part of the  team at the 2008 Summer Olympics. On club level, Palamarevic played for Hull in Canada.

References

1986 births
Living people
Canadian male water polo players
Water polo players at the 2008 Summer Olympics
Olympic water polo players of Canada
Bosnia and Herzegovina emigrants to Canada
People from Kakanj
Canadian people of Serbian descent
Serb diaspora sportspeople
Serbs of Bosnia and Herzegovina